Benjamin Mark Bland, known professionally as Ben Boulos, is an English presenter and journalist for the BBC News, specialising in business for UK and global audiences on programmes including Business Live, Talking Business and World Business Report, as well as being one of the main relief presenters for BBC World News, BBC News Channel and BBC World Service which operates globally to an estimated weekly audience of over 75 million viewers. Since the beginning of April 2020, Boulos has presented Around the World By BBC News weekdays on Quibi.

Boulos currently hosts a variety of programmes on BBC World News including the main bulletins, Newsday, BBC Breakfast (shown domestically in the UK), Outside Source, World News Today and several domestic UK reports for BBC News on a relief/need-by-need basis. He also hosts business news and weekend overnight broadcasts of BBC World News which are shown around the world on  BBC World News, the BBC News Channel and on BBC One in the UK and public television in the US.

He is a competitive cyclist in his spare time, and has represented Surrey at amateur level.

In February 2021, Boulos announced he will be using the name Ben Boulos, his mother's surname, in his professional work due to another journalist having the same name causing confusion, and also because he wanted a surname that conveys "a more complete picture of who I am and the influences on my life".

References

External links 
 

1984 births
Living people
English television journalists
BBC newsreaders and journalists
BBC World News
Television personalities from Leicestershire
People from Countesthorpe
English people of Lithuanian-Jewish descent
English people of Russian-Jewish descent
English people of Egyptian descent
English people of Sudanese descent
Gay journalists
English LGBT people
Gay Jews
British LGBT journalists
20th-century English Jews
21st-century English Jews